Milliken-Smith Farm is a historic home and farm complex located at Montgomery in Orange County, New York.  Contributing buildings include the Milliken-Smith house (built in 1770 and expanded about 1870), a large timber-frame barn dated to the 18th century, a light frame chicken house (c. 1900), and a banded wood storage silo.  The earliest portion of the house is a -story timber-frame building.  It was expanded during the 1870s with a 2-story light frame addition.  A non-historic addition was completed in 1962.

It was listed on the National Register of Historic Places in 2009.

References

Houses on the National Register of Historic Places in New York (state)
Houses completed in 1770
Houses in Orange County, New York
National Register of Historic Places in Orange County, New York
1770 establishments in the Province of New York